Maxdata is the name of two German information technology companies. 

The original Maxdata was founded in 1987 by Holger Lampatz in Marl, North Rhine-Westphalia, as the Maxdata Computer GmbH. It began selling personal computers in 1990. Maxdata used its own name for B2B products while selling notebooks and displays for the customer market under the Belinea brand.

In 2003, the company was restructured as the Maxdata AG and listed in the Prime Standard. Maxdata filed insolvency proceedings at the Local Court in Essen on Wednesday, 25 June 2008. It had 1000 employees at the time of closure. The Belinea brand was sold to Brunen IT Group while the Maxdata name was sold to S&T.

The Maxdata Computer AG, a fully-owned Swiss subsidiary of the Maxdata AG, was taken over by Brunen IT as Belinea AG before being sold to S&T and re-named Maxdata (Schweiz) AG. In 2016, S&T stopped the production of computers and notebooks.

S&T founded a new Maxdata Deutschland GmbH in 2014 in Mendig as a fully-owned subsidiary but in 2016 it was renamed to S&T Deutschland GmbH.

Products 

Its product lines included servers, desktop computers, notebooks and the Belinea series of monitors.

References

Companies based in North Rhine-Westphalia
Defunct computer hardware companies
German brands
Defunct technology companies of Germany
Technology companies disestablished in 2008